Gregory B. McKnight (born November 14, 1976) is an American serial killer who murdered two people and buried their bodies on his property in Chillicothe, Ohio, between May and November 2000. He committed the killings two years after his release from prison for a 1992 murder he committed in Columbus, Ohio. McKnight was sentenced to death for the 2000 murders and is currently awaiting execution.

Early life 
Gregory McKnight was born November 14, 1976. He was raised in Queens, New York.

Murders 
In 1992, McKnight, then 15, shot and killed a man in Columbus, Ohio. He was arrested and convicted under a juvenile court and sentenced to serve a short sentence at the Circleville Youth Center. He was released in 1997 and later married a woman named Kathryn. Kathryn had worked at the Youth Center, but it is unknown how the two met.

On May 12, 2000, 20-year-old Greg Julious was last seen alive by friends. The following day, McKnight, an acquaintance of Julious, abducted and killed him. He dismembered his body and hid it in his yard. Seven months later he abducted 20-year-old Kenyon College student Emily Murray. Murray worked at a restaurant near the campus. McKnight also worked at the restaurant, and left work minutes after Murray left. He caught up with Murray and kidnapped her. He brought her back to his house and shot her once in the head, killing her. He wrapped her body with a carpet and hid it in his trailer.

A month later, Gregory and Kathryn were arrested when Murray's car was found in their driveway. In a further search of their property, they found Murray's decomposed body in McKnight's trailer. They also found bones that matched those of Julious.

Trial 
Kathryn McKnight was released from police custody once police ruled out her involvement in the homicides. Shortly before Gregory McKnight's trial, three locals trespassed on his former property and reportedly stole a few items. The trespassers, Rosalee Jackson, Kenneth R. Jackson, and Jeffrey A. Jackson, were each indicted on a misdemeanor count of criminal trespassing and theft. Since the trial was due to occur in Vinton County, a small county with at the time less than 13,000 residents, Ohio judge Jeffrey Simmons briefly ruled out the death penalty in the trial due to Vinton County lacking enough money to guarantee McKnight a fair trial.

Nevertheless, the trial began on October 1, 2002. Despite the argument about the cost of a fair trial, McKnight still faced a death sentence if convicted. To convince the jury of McKnight's guilt, prosecutors collected items previously seized from his residence; a shovel, a brush cutter, an axe, and a hunting knife were compared to marks of Julious' bones, but the shovel was ruled out, and the other items were inconclusive. Due to uncertainty over how Julious was killed, prosecutors decided not to seek the death penalty for his murder. They did seek the death penalty for Murray's murder since they knew he had shot her once in the head.

At the end of the trial, after less than an hour of deliberating, McKnight was convicted of all charges: murder, aggravated murder, kidnapping, aggravated robbery, receiving stolen property, and complicity. The jury sentenced him to death for the aggravated murder charge, life imprisonment for the murder charge, ten years for the kidnapping charge, eight years for the complicity charge, and  years for receiving stolen property.

McKnight arrived on Ohio's death row following his sentencing. In 2015, McKnight volunteered for execution, saying he wanted to die for his crimes. He later recanted that statement. In 2020, McKnight alleged racism during his trial and claimed white jurors had been heard making racial slurs. McKnight is awaiting execution at Chillicothe Correctional Institution.

See also 
 List of death row inmates in the United States
 List of serial killers in the United States

References 

1976 births
20th-century African-American people
20th-century American criminals
21st-century African-American people
21st-century American criminals
African-American people
American male criminals
American people convicted of murder
American prisoners sentenced to death
American serial killers
Living people
Male serial killers
People convicted of murder by Ohio
Place of birth missing (living people)
Prisoners sentenced to death by Ohio